Ameroduvalius jeanneli is a species of beetle in the family Carabidae, the only species in the genus Ameroduvalius.

References

Trechinae